Multan, being a rich cultural city in Pakistan, celebrates a number of festivals throughout the year. The most popular festivals are urs Shah Rukn-e-Alam and the Spring Festival, but many other festivals and events are celebrated in the metropolis as well.

Spring Festival (Jashn-e-Baharaan)
The Spring Festival occurs in March. During the event, all city parks are covered with flowers and shows. Cantt Garden is famous for flower shows and exhibitions.

Basant

The Basant is an event featuring kite flying, but it is banned nowadays due to several people having died of cut throats when they encountered kite strings.

Urs Shah Rukn-e-Alam
Urs Shah Rukn-e-Alam is a religious event where people gather at the tomb of Shah Rukn-e-Alam located in the Multan Fort. It occurs annually.

Urs Bahauddin Zakariya
Urs Bahauddin Zakariya is an annual religious event in which people gather around the shrine of Bahauddin Zakariya.

Urs Shah Shams Tabrizi
Urs Shah Shams Tabrizi occurs annually through July 1 to 3.

References

Festivals in Punjab, Pakistan
Multan